Coalition is an album by American jazz drummer Elvin Jones recorded in 1970 and released on the Blue Note label. It features Jones in a quintet with tenor saxophonists Frank Foster and George Coleman, conguero Candido Camero and bassist Wilbur Little.

Reception
The Allmusic review by Scott Yanow awarded the album 4 stars stating "This was a particularly creative and often intense ensemble, attached to the hard bop tradition but always looking forward".

Track listing
 "Shinjitu" (Elvin Jones) - 7:38
 "Yesterdays" (Otto Harbach, Jerome Kern) - 10:56
 "5/4 Thing" (George Coleman) - 5:26
 "Ural Stradania" (Frank Foster) - 8:29
 "Simone" (Foster) - 6:31

Personnel
Elvin Jones - drums
George Coleman - tenor saxophone
Frank Foster - tenor saxophone, bass clarinet
Wilbur Little - bass
Candido Camero - conga, tambourine

References

Blue Note Records albums
Elvin Jones albums
1970 albums
Albums produced by Francis Wolff
Albums recorded at Van Gelder Studio